United Labour or United Labour Party may refer to:

Grenada United Labour Party, founded in 1950
United Labour Front, a former political party in Trinidad and Tobago, the main opposition party between 1976 and 1986
United Labour Party (Armenia)
United Labor Party (New York), a short lived regional labor political party in New York City that ran in the 1886 New York City mayoral election.
United Labour Party (New Zealand), an early left-wing political party, representing the more moderate wing of the labour movement
United Labour Party (Northern Ireland), a minor political party
United Labour Party (Papua New Guinea)
United Labor Party of South Australia

See also
Ahdut HaAvoda, a former political party in Israel
Labour United, a political party in Poland